Lytton is a city in Sac County and has grown into Calhoun County in the U.S. state of Iowa. The population was 282 at the time of the 2020 census.

Geography
Lytton is located at  (42.424360, -94.859129).

History
Lytton was named for the English author Edward Bulwer-Lytton. The post office was established January 10, 1900. Iowa Supreme Court justice Daryl Hecht (1952–2019) was raised on a farm near Lytton.

Demographics

2010 census
As of the 2010 United States Census, there were 315 people, 135 households, and 78 families residing in the city. The racial makeup of the city was 99.0% White, 0.3% from other races, and 0.6% from two or more races. Hispanic or Latino of any race were 2.2% of the population.

There were 135 households, of which 28.1% had children under the age of 18 living with them, 42.2% were married couples living together, 8.9% had a female householder with no husband present, 6.7% had a male householder with no wife present, and 42.2% were non-families. 34.1% of all households were made up of individuals, and 13.3% had someone living alone who was 65 years of age or older. The average household size was 2.33 and the average family size was 3.00.

The median age in the city was 39.4 years. 24.1% of residents were under the age of 18; 6.9% were between the ages of 18 and 24; 26.3% were from 25 to 44; 27% were from 45 to 64; and 15.6% were 65 years of age or older. The gender makeup of the city was 50.5% male and 49.5% female.

Education
Lytton is within the South Central Calhoun Community School District.

It was a part of the Lytton Community School District until July 1, 1993, when it merged into the Rockwell City–Lytton Community School District. That in turn merged into South Central Calhoun on July 1, 2014.

References

External links

Cities in Calhoun County, Iowa
Cities in Sac County, Iowa
Cities in Iowa